"La publicité" is a 1967 single by French singer-songwriter Jacques Dutronc.

Track listing 
Words by Jacques Lanzmann and Anne Ségalen, music by Jacques Dutronc.

Side A

Side B 

Jacques Dutronc songs
1967 singles
Songs written by Jacques Lanzmann
Songs written by Jacques Dutronc
1967 songs
Disques Vogue singles